Ålandsparken was an amusement park located in Mariehamn in Åland.

The park was relatively small, because Åland is a small area, both geographically and in terms of population number and density. The native population is probably too small to support a permanent amusement park, but Ålandsparken was located near Silja Line and Viking Line terminals, so it attracted tourists coming from the mainland of Finland and Sweden. The annual number of visitors is said to have been around 40,000.

Ålandsparken had a number of amusement rides and around 60 different coin-operated penny arcade machines. In addition, there were other attractions in the area, such as mini golf. During its operating years, the park grew from the 1980s to the 1990s and was permanently closed in the 2000s.

The reasons for closing the park are to some extent unknown, but it is believed that the low number of visitors was not enough to support the park financially.

There is a new park, called Mariepark nearby and partly on the same location as where Ålandsparken used to be. Mariepark is not, however, an amusement park like Ålandsparken was. Mariepark has some restaurants and a festival area for concerts and other events, but there are no amusement rides in the area.

The old Ålandsparken rides are in fact still in place, in unusable condition, rusting and broken, making Ålandsparken an existing, but abandoned amusement park.

Rides and attractions

Major rides

Family rides

Kiddie rides

Attractions 

Defunct amusement parks in Finland
1984 establishments in Finland
2002 disestablishments in Finland
Mariehamn
Amusement parks opened in 1984
Amusement parks closed in 2002